Alvin Tobias Hert (April 8, 1865 – June 7, 1921)  was the mayor of Brazil, Indiana in 1895. He was the warden of the Indiana Reformatory in Jeffersonville, Indiana in 1902. In 1902 he was named president of the American Creosoting Company. He was a committeeman representing Kentucky at the 1916 Republican National Convention.

Biography
He was born on April 8, 1865 in Owensburg, Indiana to William Hert and Isabel Owen.

On November 20, 1893, he married Sallie Aley (1863-1948). He became the mayor of Brazil, Indiana in 1895.

He was the warden of the Indiana Reformatory in Jeffersonville, Indiana in 1902. He then moved to Louisville, Kentucky where he became president of the American Creosoting Company.

He died on June 7, 1921, in Washington, D.C. He was buried in Cave Hill Cemetery in Louisville, Kentucky.

Memberships
Pendennis Club of Louisville, Kentucky, Audubon Club of Louisville, Kentucky Club and River Valley Club of Louisville, Kentucky; Union League Club of Chicago, and Columbia Club of Indianapolis, Indiana. He was a Knight Templar Mason.

References

External links

1865 births
1921 deaths
Burials at Cave Hill Cemetery
People from Greene County, Indiana
Mayors of places in Indiana
Businesspeople from Louisville, Kentucky
Kentucky Republicans